Sunday Salvacion (born December 17, 1978) is a Filipino former professional basketball player. He played the small forward and shooting guard positions. Salvacion played college basketball for the De La Salle–College of Saint Benilde (DLS-CSB) Blazers before spending twelve years in the Philippine Basketball Association (PBA). Salvacion also played in the ASEAN Basketball League (ABL) and the Maharlika Pilipinas Basketball League (MPBL).

Career
Known as a scorer during his college days, Salvacion, who was a former NCAA Most Valuable Player has evolved into a solid defender and a clutch shooter that placed him in the regular rotation of the Barangay Ginebra Kings. Salvacion (which when translated in English means "salvation") is one of the best shooters the PBA has produced.

Known to elevate his game during the playoffs, Salvacion's contribution was more evident during Ginebra's championship runs on the 2004–2005 and 2006–2007 Philippine Cup where he proved to be one of the key players.

On September 12, 2014, he and Jason Ballesteros were sent to Blackwater Elite in a three-way trade involving NLEX Road Warriors and Meralco Bolts. NLEX obtained Blackwater's 2016 and 2017 2nd round pick along with the draft rights for Juneric Baloria. Meralco received Sean Anthony from NLEX via Blackwater as third party.

In September 2015, Salvacion was signed by the Pacquiao Powervit Pilipinas Aguilas, which later became known as the Pilipinas MX3 Kings, of the ABL as one of the team's local players. However, in December 2015, Salvacion, along with Emmerson Oreta, Charles Mammie, Chad Alonzo, Jondan Salvador, and Adrian Celada were released by the Pilipinas MX3 Kings after a roster overhaul.

Salvacion later became part of the Navotas Clutch of the Maharlika Pilipinas Basketball League as a playing assistant coach to Elvis Tolentino.

PBA career statistics

Season-by-season averages

|-
| align=left | 
| align=left | Barangay Ginebra
| 35 || 16.5 || .382 || .289 || .714 || 2.9 || .5 || .3 || .0 || 6.5
|-
| align=left | 
| align=left | Barangay Ginebra
| 76 || 19.8 || .343 || .319 || .625 || 3.1 || .7 || .3 || .2 || 5.3
|-
| align=left | 
| align=left | Barangay Ginebra
| 41 || 13.6 || .387 || .250 || .706 || 2.4 || .3 || .1 || .1 || 3.7
|-
| align=left | 
| align=left | Barangay Ginebra
| 52 || 26.9 || .470 || .316 || .767 || 5.0 || .9 || .2 || .2 || 10.6
|-
| align=left | 
| align=left | Barangay Ginebra
| 45 || 18.0 || .336 || .330 || .800 || 3.5 || .8 || .1 || .0 || 6.4
|-
| align=left | 
| align=left | Barangay Ginebra
| 40 || 21.3 || .357 || .323 || .580 || 3.8 || 1.0 || .1 || .1 || 9.5
|-
| align=left | 
| align=left | Barangay Ginebra
| 35 || 16.2 || .362 || .324 || .800 || 3.4 || .5 || .2 || .0 || 6.1
|-
| align=left | 
| align=left | Barako Bull / San Miguel
| 55 || 20.0 || .349 || .316 || .714 || 3.2 || .6 || .2 || .1 || 7.2
|-
| align=left | 
| align=left | Barako Bull
| 20 || 17.1 || .320 || .294 || .500 || 1.8 || .6 || .4 || .1 || 5.5
|-
| align=left | 
| align=left | Meralco
| 42 || 20.4 || .354 || .350 || .750 || 2.9 || .5 || .2 || .1 || 6.7
|-
| align=left | 
| align=left | Meralco
| 25 || 14.8 || .368 || .347 || .900 || 1.4 || .2 || .2 || .0 || 5.0
|-
| align=left | 
| align=left | Blackwater
| 20 || 15.5 || .325 || .269 || .800 || 1.7 || .4 || .2 || .1 || 6.0
|-
| align=left | 
| align=left | GlobalPort
| 6 ||	11.3 || .500 || .429 || .333 || 1.2 ||	.0 ||	.2 ||	.2 ||	2.7
|-class=sortbottom
| align=center colspan=2 | Career
| 492 || 19.0 || .368 || .317 || .717 || 3.1 || .6 || .2 || .1 || 6.6

Personal life
Salvacion now resides in Antipolo along with his mother, sister and his wife.

References

1978 births
Living people
Barako Bull Energy Boosters players
Barako Bull Energy players
Barangay Ginebra San Miguel players
Basketball players from Surigao del Sur
Blackwater Bossing players
NorthPort Batang Pier players
Filipino men's basketball players
Filipino Roman Catholics
Maharlika Pilipinas Basketball League players
Meralco Bolts players
Benilde Blazers basketball players
People from Rizal
Philippine Basketball Association All-Stars
San Miguel Beermen players
Small forwards
Shooting guards
Barangay Ginebra San Miguel draft picks